Rodrigo Fresán (born 1963 in Buenos Aires, Argentina) is a fiction writer and journalist. Since 1999, Fresán has lived and worked in Barcelona, Spain. His books have been translated into many languages.

Mantra, a portrait of Mexico City ca. 2000, reveals the deep influence of science fiction novels (Philip K. Dick in particular), movies (Stanley Kubrick) and TV shows (The Twilight Zone). According to Jonathan Lethem, "he's a kaleidoscopic, open-hearted, shamelessly polymathic storyteller, the kind who brings a blast of oxygen into the room."

He was a close friend of the late Chilean writer Roberto Bolaño.

Works 

 Historia Argentina (1991)
 Vidas de santos (1993)
 Trabajos Manuales (1994)
 Esperanto (1995)
 La velocidad de las cosas (1998)
 Mantra (2001)
 Jardines de Kensington (2003). Kensington Gardens, trans. Natasha Wimmer (Farrar Straus Giroux, 2006)
 El fondo del cielo (2009). The Bottom of the Sky, trans. Will Vanderhyden (Open Letter, 2018).
 La parte inventada (2014). The Invented Part, trans. Will Vanderhyden (Open Letter, 2017).
 La parte soñada (2017). The Dreamed Part, trans. Will Vanderhyden (Open Letter, 2019).
La parte recordada (2019). The Remembered Part, trans. Will Vanderhyden (Open Letter, 2022).
Melvill (2022). Melvill, trans. Will Vanderhyden (Open Letter, 2023).

Awards and honors 
In 2017, Rodrigo Fresán received the prestigious Prix Roger Caillois.

In 2018, The Invented Part won the Best Translated Book Award.

External links
Biography 
Interview 
Another interview 
Interview in the literary blog Hablando del asunto, November 2009.

References

1963 births
Living people
People from Barcelona
People from Buenos Aires
Argentine male writers
International Writing Program alumni